The 2007–08 National Division Three South was the eighth season (21st overall)  of the fourth division (south) of the English domestic rugby union competition using the name National Division Three South.  New teams to the division included Barking who were relegated from the 2006–07 National Division Two while promoted sides included London Scottish (champions) and Ealing (playoffs) who came up from London Division 1, Mounts Bay who came up as champions of South West Division 1 and Luton who were Midlands Division 1 champions.   In the case of Luton, Midlands league champions usually moved up to National Division Three North but due to number imbalances in that division, for this season, they would go into National Division Three South instead.  The league system was 4 points for a win, 2 points for a draw and additional bonus points being awarded for scoring 4 or more tries and/or losing within 7 points of the victorious team.  In terms of promotion the league champions would go straight up into National Division Two while the runners up would have a one-game playoff against the runners up from National Division Three North (at the home ground of the club with the superior league record) for the final promotion place.

In what was a very competitive league there were a number of teams tipped to go up but in the end it was Mounts Bay who came out on top as champions 12 points clear and sealing promotion to the 2008–09 National Division Two - part of an incredible sequence of six successive promotions stretching back to Cornwall 1 in 2003-04.  The battle for the runner up spot was keenly contested between Cinderford and newly promoted Ealing Trailfinders but in the end the Gloucestershire side took second spot despite losing their final game to the west Londoners.  Cinderford would join Mounts Bay in National Division Two after defeating 2007–08 National Division Three North runners up  Darlington Mowden Park in a very close playoff game viewed by over 2,000 spectators at Dockham Road.  At the other end of the table newly promoted Luton went straight back down as the worst side in the division followed by  North Walsham.  The third and final relegation spot was very closely contested but eventually Clifton went down just 1 point behind relegation rivals Barking and Havant - a last gasp away victory against relegation rivals Havant not being enough as Barking had a shock win against champions Mount Bays to keep them up instead.  Luton and North Walsham would drop to London Division 1 while Clifton would go into South West Division 1.

Participating teams and locations

Final league table

Notes

Results

Round 1

Round 2

Round 3

Round 4

Round 5

Round 6

Round 7

Round 8

Round 9

Round 10

Round 11

Round 12 

Postponed.  Game rescheduled to 2 February 2008.

Postponed.  Game rescheduled to 12 January 2008.

Round 13

Round 14

Round 15

Round 12 (rescheduled game) 

Game rescheduled from 1 December 2007.

Round 16

Round 17

Round 12 (rescheduled game) 

Game rescheduled from 1 December 2007.

Round 18

Round 19

Round 20

Round 21

Round 22

Round 23

Round 24

Round 25

Round 26

Promotion play-off
The league runners up of National Division Three South and North would meet in a playoff game for promotion to National Division Two.  Cinderford were the southern division runners up and as they had a superior league record than northern runners-up, Darlington Mowden Park, they hosted the play-off match.

Total season attendances

Individual statistics 

 Note that points scorers includes tries as well as conversions, penalties and drop goals.

Top points scorers

Top try scorers

Season records

Team
Largest home win — 61 pts
61 - 0 Cinderford at home to North Walsham on 22 September 2007
Largest away win — 39 pts
39 - 0 Cinderford away to Havant on 27 October 2007
Most points scored — 71 pts
71 - 17 Ealing Trailfinders at home to Clifton on 20 October 2007
Most tries in a match — 10 (x4)
Cinderford at home to North Walsham on 22 September 2007
Ealing Trailfinders at home to Clifton on 20 October 2007
London Scottish at home to Luton on 19 January 2008
Mounts Bay v Luton on 15 March 2008
Most conversions in a match — 9 (x2)
Ealing Trailfinders at home to Clifton on 20 October 2007
Mounts Bay v Luton on 15 March 2008
Most penalties in a match — 6 (x2)
Mounts Bay away to Ealing Trailfinders on 3 November 2007
Luton at home to North Walsham on 22 December 2007
Most drop goals in a match — 1
N/A - multiple teams

Player
Most points in a match — 27
 Lee Jarvis for Mounts Bay away to Bridgwater & Albion on 8 September 2007
Most tries in a match — 4 (x2)
 Stuart Peel for London Scottish at home to Barking on 20 October 2007
 Gert De Kock for Canterbury at home to Barking on 12 April 2008
Most conversions in a match — 9 (x2)
 Lee Jarvis for Mounts Bay at home to Barking on 1 September 2007
 Ben Ward for Ealing Trailfinders at home to Clifton on 20 October 2007
Most penalties in a match — 6 (x3)
 Tim Mosey for Mounts Bay away to Ealing Trailfinders on 3 November 2007
 Lee Jarvis for Mounts Bay at home to Lydney on 10 November 2007
 Andy Davey for Luton at home to North Walsham on 22 December 2007
Most drop goals in a match — 1
N/A - multiple players

Attendances
Highest — 2,100  
Cinderford at home to Lydney on 8 September 2007
Lowest — 66 
Clifton at home to Barking on 2 February 2008
Highest Average Attendance — 624
Bridgwater & Albion
Lowest Average Attendance — 136
Clifton

See also
 English rugby union system
 Rugby union in England

References

External links
 NCA Rugby

2007-08
N3